Patrick McManus (10 September 1867 – 1940) was a Scottish footballer who played in the Football League for West Bromwich Albion.

References

1867 births
1940 deaths
Scottish footballers
English Football League players
Scottish Football League players
Association football midfielders
Cowlairs F.C. players
Derby County F.C.
Darlington F.C. players
Mossend Swifts F.C. players
St Bernard's F.C. players
Celtic F.C. players
West Bromwich Albion F.C. players
Warmley F.C. players
Thames Ironworks F.C. players
Footballers from West Lothian